Puerto del Rosario is a town and a municipality in the eastern part of the island of Fuerteventura in the Las Palmas province in the Canary Islands. It has been the capital of Fuerteventura since 1860. The town's population is 29,160 (2013), the administrative district's (municipio de Puerto del Rosario) population is 36,744 and its area is 289.95 km².

History 
Originally known as Puerto de Cabras (Port of the Goats), Puerto del Rosario was initially of little political importance on the island, living in the shadow of the ancient capital Betancuria. It had long been a fishing settlement and benefited from a sheltered natural harbour. The "Atlantic Navigator", written in 1854, describes the town then known as "Cabras" as "the main port", but goes on to describe it as an "insignificant place". The "Atlantic Navigator" describes the makeshift landing area for shipping as "indifferent", while calling the "beach of shingles" where ships anchor as "even worse".
It was this status as the "central port" of the island that saw it become the capital of the island in 1860, taking that honour from Antigua. The port was popular for shipping goats and this is where its original name came from. However, in 1957, it was decided that the name "Cabras" was not suitable. A more attractive name was selected and Puerto de Cabras was renamed Puerto del Rosario ("rosary port").

During the 1960s there was rural and urban migration from the smaller villages and farm areas of the island into Puerto del Rosario. The population grew in these years. Further population growth occurred in 1976 when, due to the decolonisation of the North African territories like the Spanish Sahara, the Spanish Foreign Legion made Puerto del Rosario their base.

Climate 
Under the Köppen climate classification, Puerto del Rosario has a hot desert climate (BWh).

Transport
There are regular ferry services to Las Palmas and Santa Cruz de Tenerife with Naviera Armas. Fuerteventura Airport is situated near El Matorral, 6 km south of Puerto del Rosario.

Gallery

See also
List of municipalities in Las Palmas

References

External links

Puerto del Rosario Information, Map and Photos
Puerto del Rosario on FuerteventuraInfo.com

Municipalities in Fuerteventura